Middlesbrough Bus Station serves the town of Middlesbrough in North Yorkshire, England.

History 
It was opened in 1982, at a cost of £5.3 million, by the actress Pat Phoenix. It stands partly on the site of the previous bus station, which belonged to United Automobile Services.

From mid-July 2012, the bus station was partially closed for around six weeks, to allow for improvement work to take place – at a cost of around £1.5 million. Work was carried out in order to improve accessibility for disabled people, by creating low floor access at the majority of stops. As well as this, work was undertaken to reconstruct the main concourse, and a partial reconstruction of the ramps.

On 2 February 2015 an Arriva bus service 28 collided with the bus stations south stands, no one was injured in the crash but significant damage was sustained to the bus station building which included damage to the roof and floor to ceiling windows.

On 23 December 2021 an out of service Arriva bus was shunted into the bus stations north stands by a Go Northeast coach, again no one was injured but damage was sustained to the bus station building which included damage to the railings, roof and floor to ceiling windows.

Operators 
There are 21 stands for local bus services, with additional stands located on the upper floor for regional and national coach services.

Arriva North East and Stagecoach North East operate most routes in and around the town.

Stagecoach North East routes 36, 37 and 38 combine to provide up to 8 buses per hour between Middlesbrough and Stockton, with services continuing to Hartlepool, North Tees Hospital and Norton. The company also operates a regular service to Coulby Newham, James Cook University Hospital, Hemlington and Park End.

Arriva North East operate services from the town to County Durham, Darlington, North Yorkshire and the Tees Valley. The company also operates the X93 service, which runs from Middlesbrough to Guisborough, Whitby, Robin Hood's Bay and Scarborough.

Go North East operate the X-Lines X10 express service from Middlesbrough to Newcastle upon Tyne via Peterlee, using a fleet of four high-specification double-deck Alexander Dennis Enviro 400 MMC vehicles, branded in a gold and purple livery.

Megabus and National Express operate regional and national coach services accessed via the express lounge located on the upper floor of the bus station.

Services 
As of April 2022, the stand allocation is:

References

External links

 

Bus stations in England
Transport in Middlesbrough
Buildings and structures in Middlesbrough